The Japan national under-17 football team（Japanese: U-17サッカー日本代表）is a national association football youth team of Japan and is controlled by the Japan Football Association. The team were champions in the 1994 and 2006 AFC U-17 Championships, as well as the 2012 AFF U-16 Youth Championship. The year before the FIFA U-17 World Cup, the national team is renamed the Japan national under-16 football team, and the year before that, the national team is renamed the Japan national under-15 football team.

Results and fixtures

Legend

2023
Fixtures & Results (U-17 2023), JFA.jp

2022

Fixtures & Results (U-17 2022), JFA.jp

U-16

Fixtures & Results (U-16 2022), JFA.jp

U-15

Fixtures & Results (U-15 2022), JFA.jp

2023

U-17

High School

Fixtures & Results (U-17 2023), JFA.jp

Coaching staff

Current U-16 coaching staff
.

Current U-15 coaching staff

Manager history

Players

Current U-17 squad
The following U-17 players were named for a tour held on Algeria, held from 18 to 30 March 2023.

Recent U-17 call-ups
The following players were called up to the squad in the past 12 months.

Current U-16 squad
The following players were called up to the Copa Joaju, held in Paraguay from 13 to 17 December 2022.

Recent U-16 call-ups
The following players were called up to the squad in the past 12 months.

Current U-15 squad
The following U-15 players were named for a training camp, taking place at the J-Green Sakai during 6 to 10 March 2023.

Recent U-15 call-ups
The following players were called up to the squad in the past 12 months.

Previous squads

FIFA U-17 World Cup
1993 FIFA U-17 World Championship
1995 FIFA U-17 World Championship
2001 FIFA U-17 World Championship
2007 FIFA U-17 World Cup
2009 FIFA U-17 World Cup
2011 FIFA U-17 World Cup
2013 FIFA U-17 World Cup
2017 FIFA U-17 World Cup
2019 FIFA U-17 World Cup

AFC U-17 Asian Cup
2010 AFC U-16 Championship
2012 AFC U-16 Championship
2014 AFC U-16 Championship
2016 AFC U-16 Championship
2018 AFC U-16 Championship

High School squads

Current U-17 High School squad
The following players (from 1st to 2nd grade of compulsory education) were named for the J-Village Cup U-18, held from 17 to 21 March 2023.

Recent U-17 High School call-ups
The following players were called up to the squad in the past 12 months.

Records

Most capped player

Top goalscorer

Honours

Continental
 AFC U-17/U-16 Championship
Champions (3): 1994, 2006, 2018
 AFF U-16 Youth Championship
Champions (1): 2012

Unofficial
 Tournament de Montaigu
Champions (1): 2004
Runners-Up (1): 2005

 International Dream Cup
Champions (4): 2015, 2017, 2019, 2022
Runners-Up (1): 2016

Competitive record

FIFA U-17 World Cup

*Denotes draws includes knockout matches decided on penalty kicks. Red border indicates that the tournament was hosted on home soil.

AFC U-17 Asian Cup

*Denotes draws includes knockout matches decided on penalty kicks. Red border indicates that the tournament was hosted on home soil.

See also

Japan
Men's
International footballers
National football team (Results (2020–present))
National under-23 football team
National under-20 football team
National futsal team
National under-20 futsal team
National beach soccer team
Women's
International footballers
National football team (Results)
National under-20 football team
National under-17 football team
National futsal team

References

External links
 Japan national under-17 football team – official website at JFA.jp 
 Japan national team 2021 schedule at JFA.jp 

Youth football in Japan
Asian national under-17 association football teams
Football